The Republic of Iraq's legal system is in a period of transition in light of the U.S.-led invasion in 2003 that led to the fall of the Baath Party. Iraq does have a written constitution, as well as a civil, criminal and personal status law. In September 2008, the Iraqi Legal Database, a comprehensive database that makes all Iraqi positive law freely available (only in Arabic) to users online, was launched.

Constitutional law 

The current Constitution of Iraq was approved in a national referendum in October 2005 and stipulates the format of the new republican government, and the rights and responsibilities of the Iraqi people. Despite the rejection of the provinces of Anbar, Saladin, and Nineveh, the overall turnout was 63 percent, with more than 90 percent voting for its adoption.

The Constitution promises several civil liberties including freedom of speech, freedom of religion, freedom of peaceful assembly, freedom of expression, a free press, and a right to have a private life. All such personal liberties contain two main exemption clauses: the Iraqi Council of Representatives has the power to define what these freedoms mean, and, that no freedom may conflict with Islamic morality.

Islam is the official state religion, and no law may be enacted or enforced that violates the "undisputed" teachings of Islam. An official English translation of the Iraqi Constitution is available online at the Iraqi government's homepage.

There are legal experts, however, who criticize the failure of the 2005 Iraqi Constitution, particularly with respect to its perceived disastrous political consequences. For instance, an evaluation of the International Crisis Group revealed that the federal system of government outlined in this fundamental law encourages ethnic divisions and manufactures pluralism. There are also observers who cite the "excessive concessions granted to the Kurds on the issues of federal government." This is blamed for the so-called weaknesses of the new Iraqi Constitution.

Criminal code 

In 2003, Paul Bremer led the Coalition Provisional Authority (CPA) and issued a series of binding "regulations" "memorandums" and "orders". On  June 10, 2003, Bremer issued "Order Number 7" that stipulated that the binding Iraqi Criminal or Penal Code would be the 1984 vintage third edition of the law first enacted in 1969. Paul Bremer made some amendments to both the Penal Code and the Criminal Procedure Code of 1971.

All the CPA orders, memoranda and regulations are available at the CPA Official Document Archive.
An English translation copy of both codes prior to their CPA and subsequent amendment can be viewed online at the Case Western University website.

Order Number 31 also provides several amendments to the penal code, including:

 The maximum penalty for kidnapping is life imprisonment, and the mitigating circumstances provided in Penal Code Articles 426 Paragraphs 1 and 2 and 427 were repealed.
 The maximum penalty for rape and sexual assault in Article 393 is now life imprisonment.
 The maximum penalty for indecent assault in Article 396 is now fifteen years.
 The maximum penalty for the destruction of public utilities in Article 353 is now life imprisonment.

Civil Code 

The Iraqi Civil Code was principally drafted by Abd El-Razzak El-Sanhuri, a French-educated Egyptian jurist who was also the
principal drafter of the Egyptian Civil Code.  In 1943, almost a decade after the push for a comprehensive modern code began in Iraq, Al-Sanhūrī was invited to Iraq by the Iraqi government and asked to complete the Civil Code. Working as the chairman of a committee of Iraqi jurists, using the Egyptian Civil Code as a model, he completed a draft of what would become the modern Iraqi Civil Code. The Iraqi Civil Code was enacted on September 8, 1951 and became effective two years later on September 8, 1953.

The Iraqi Code is based on the Egyptian and before that French Code Civil.  Although it incorporates Islamic elements, its overall structure and substance is principally based on continental civil law.  Therefore, it shares common substance and legal theory with other legal systems based on that model such as Egypt, France, Ethiopia, Spain, Italy, and the state of Louisiana.

The Iraqi Civil Code is divided into a preliminary part and two main parts, each main part composed of two books. The preliminary part contains definitions and general principles that find application throughout the rest of the code. Part I of the Code and its two books address obligations in general and subelements of that area of law, such as contracts, torts, and unjust enrichment. Part II and its two books address property, ownership, and real rights.

Laws of personal status 

The 1959 Iraq Law of Personal Status (as subsequently amended) governs the manner that religious courts may settle disputes among Muslims living in Iraq in the area of marriage, divorce, custody of children, inheritance, endowments and other similar religious matters. These rulings are binding, unless they conflict with some other provision of the Iraqi legal system. Christians, Jews and other minorities are covered partly by the Personal Status Law, partly the Civil Law and partly their own personal status legal systems.

In 2003 the Iraqi Interim Governing Council issued Resolution 137 on 29 December that expanded the power of Muslim courts to rule in all disputes among Muslims concerning marriage and divorce.  It would appear that this Resolution was overruled by Paul Bremer after domestic and international human rights groups protested the resolution on the grounds that the imposition of Islamic law would erode Iraqi women's rights.

An English translation exists on the American Bar Association website.

Military law 

The current basis for the organization and discipline of the Iraqi military originates from Bremer Orders Number 22 and 23 issued in 2003.

Private Sector law 
The fundamental definition of the private sector was mentioned in article 8 of the Law of Companies No 21 (1997) states: "A private-sector company is established on the agreement between two or more persons outside the nation sector, using private capital." Article 8, in addition, obtains a provision that includes private-joint stock or limited liability companies whenever the state gets a share of less than 25% of the capital. Internationally, it is universally accepted that the private sector represents the key part of the national economy that is not under direct state control and that is run for economic profit.

Election law 

Paul Bremer legalized political parties and NGOs, and the specific rules regulating political parties were enacted by the 2004 Independent Electoral Commission of Iraq.  Under these rules an Iraqi political party must register with the Commission in order to be entitled to have its endorsed candidates appear on the election ballot. Registration of a political party (aka "political entities") includes paying a filing fee of 2.5 million Iraqi dinars, a second party registration fee of 7.5 million dinars and petition signatures from five hundred Iraqi citizens.

International law

The Iraqi government has ratified various international treaties and documents.

See also
 Iraqi Penal Code
 Law enforcement in Iraq
 Iraqi Police
 Iraqi nationality law
 Iraqi Local Governance Law Library

References

External links 
Law in Iraq : A Document Companion
A Long Way From A Way Forward : Our Journey Through Legal Reform in Post-War Iraq
The Iraqi Legal Database
A collection of articles, drafts, studies and reports on the Iraqi constitution
Global Justice Project: Iraq
The Iraqi Higher Judicial Council
The Iraqi Council of Ministers
The Iraqi Council of Representatives
United Nations Development Programme
The Programme on Governance in the Arab Region
United Nations Development Programme (Iraq Country Office)
The United Nations Assistance Mission for Iraq
Iraqi Local Governance Law library

Constitution
Iraqi Constitution of 2005
Iraq Constitution of 1990 & 2004 

Iraqi Civil and Criminal Law 
CPA Documents
Iraqi Law with Emphasis on Corporate Law
 A history and analysis of Iraqi Civil Law 
 From Baton Rouge to Baghdad: A Comparative Overview of the Iraqi Civil Code, 65 LA. L. REV. 131 (2004)

Iraqi Election Law
Iraqi Election Law

Personal Status Law/The Role of Islam in Iraqi Law 
"Debating Islam in Post-Baathist Iraq"